Ada Aimée De La Cruz Ramírez (born June 15, 1986, in Villa Mella) is a Dominican model and beauty queen who was crowned Miss Dominican Republic 2009 and placed 1st Runner-Up at Miss Universe 2009.

Biography

her first came to fame as Miss Dominican Republic World 2007, where she placed in the top 16 at Miss World 2007 and was Miss World Beach Beauty 2007. She later was crowned Miss Dominican Republic Universe 2009. She represented the original home of her grandparents, the Province of San José de Ocoa and represented the Dominican Republic at the Miss Universe 2009 gaining high praise and finishing as First Runner Up.

Ada was born in Villa Mella and raised in Villa Altagracia and returned to Santo Domingo at the age of 14, lives with her mother Ana Martínez Ramírez, grandparents Celeste Ramírez and Ventura Garabito, her younger brother Adrián and her little cousin. In the Dominican press, she is known as a Dominican Cinderella, in which her grandmother was a maid and her whole family grew up poor.

Pageantry and Modeling
She also competed in the Miss Dominican Republic Universe 2007, where she remained among the Top 10 semifinalists. She has participated in international gateways, such as Miami Fashion Week, New York Fashion Week, Dominicana Moda, among others.

Miss World 2007
Ada is the first Dominican to win the Miss World Beach Beauty. She placed in the final top 16 at Miss World 2007.

Miss Universe 2009
In the competition, Ada was awarded the 2nd best body in the swimsuit competition in Miss Universe 2009. On August 23, 2009, during the final ceremony, Ada received the highest scores in the evening gown and the second highest in the swimsuit competitions. She walked in her gown to which judges awarded a 9.428. In swimsuit, she was awarded 9.189, despite achieving the highest overall score, de la Cruz was the eventual first runner up. Same situation happened one year before in Miss Universe 2008 with Taliana Vargas.

She is one of only nine former Miss World semifinalists to place in the Miss Universe semifinals, the others being Michelle McLean of Namibia in 1992, Christine Straw of Jamaica in 2004, Yendi Phillipps also of Jamaica in 2010, Patricia Yurena Rodríguez of Spain in 2013, Olivia Jordan of the USA in 2015, Catriona Gray of the Philippines in 2018, and Julia Gama of Brazil and Andrea Meza of Mexico both in 2020 (coincidentally de la Cruz, Phillips, Rodriguez, and Gama all finished as 1st Runner-Up).

References

1986 births
Living people
People from Santo Domingo Norte
Miss Universe 2009 contestants
Dominican Republic beauty pageant winners
Miss World 2007 delegates
Miss Dominican Republic